Love is a Crazy Thing is a 2005 South Korean film.  Mismarketed as a romantic comedy, the film follows the journey of a downtrodden woman with an incompetent husband, two young sons and a stackload of debt into the world of Korean "karaoke."

See also
 List of Korean-language films

2005 films
2005 drama films
2000s Korean-language films
South Korean comedy films
2000s South Korean films